Gee Jon ( 1895 – February 8, 1924) was a Chinese national who was the first person in the United States to be executed by lethal gas. A member of the Hip Sing Tong criminal society from San Francisco, California, Gee was sentenced to death for the murder of an elderly member from another gang in Nevada. An unsuccessful attempt to pump poison gas directly into his cell at Nevada State Prison led to the development of the gas chamber.

Background
Gee Jon was born of Cantonese descent in Canton around 1895. He immigrated to the United States between 1907 and 1908 and spent most of his life at San Francisco's Chinatown in California. Gee became a member of the Hip Sing Tong society, which dealt in narcotics and liquor. In 1922, territorial disputes with the rival Bing Kong Tong society led to the outbreak of hostilities.

Death of Tom Quong Kee

Tom Quong Kee was a 74-year-old laundry proprietor who was a member of the Bing Kong Tong in Mina, Nevada. Hughie Sing, his American-educated apprentice of two years, pointed Kee out as a target for Gee. During the night of August 27, 1921, Gee knocked on the door of Kee's residence while armed with a Colt .38 revolver. Gee fatally shot Kee, who answered the door in his pajamas. Unlike many other Tong killings, Gee and Sing were apprehended.

Trial and sentencing
Gee and Sing were defended by attorneys James M. Frame and Fiore Raffetto. Gee and Sing were both convicted and sentenced to death in the District Court of Mineral County, Nevada. Sing's sentence was commuted to life imprisonment because he was only nineteen years old and Gee had committed the shooting himself. A bill authorizing the use of lethal gas had passed the Nevada State Legislature in 1921, making Gee eligible to become the first person to be executed by this method. Frame argued that Gee's sentence constituted cruel and unusual punishment, but his appeal was denied. The Supreme Court of Nevada instead complimented the state legislators for "inflicting the death penalty in the most humane manner known to modern science." Raffetto unsuccessfully filed a writ of certiorari with the U.S. 9th Circuit Court of Appeals in San Francisco. Gee was incarcerated in Nevada State Prison at Carson City.

Execution

The California Cyanide Company of Los Angeles, California, was the only distributor of liquid cyanide in the western United States and refused to deliver it to Carson City over liability concerns. The poison was used to eradicate pests from citrus groves in California. Warden Denver S. Dickerson sent his assistant Tom Pickett to Los Angeles to personally pick up 20 pounds of lethal gas, which was contained in a mobile fumigating unit that cost $700. Four guards who did not want to participate in the process had resigned. The officials first attempted to pump poison gas directly into Gee's cell while he was sleeping, but without success because the gas leaked from the cell.

A makeshift gas chamber was set up at the butcher shop of the prison. At least one cat was used to test the lethal effectiveness of the chamber. Gee was strapped onto a chair in the chamber, which was eleven feet long, ten feet wide, and eight feet high. A small window next to the wooden chair allowed witnesses to look inside. Attendees included news reporters, public health officials, and representatives of the U.S. Army. Gee wept as he was placed on the chair until the captain of the guards told him to "Brace up!" At 9:40 a.m. on February 8, 1924, the pump sprayed four pounds of hydrocyanic acid into the chamber. The weather was cold and humid. Because an electric heater failed, the chamber was 52 degrees Fahrenheit instead of the ideal 75 degrees, causing some of the acid to form a puddle on the floor. Gee appeared to lose consciousness in about five seconds, with his head continuing to nod up and down for six minutes. He was completely motionless after ten minutes. Some of the witnesses momentarily thought they smelled the odor of almond blossoms, thought to be the odor of cyanide, leaking from the chamber. The warden had the witnesses cleared from the area. At about 10 a.m., a vent was opened and a fan was turned on to discharge the poison gas. The prison staff waited for the remaining puddle of hydrocyanic acid to evaporate before cleaning up the chamber. Gee's body was removed from the chamber at 12:20 p.m. and taken to the prison hospital. A group of seven doctors pronounced him dead, but did not conduct an autopsy on the body out of concern that some remaining gas could be released. Gee was 29 years old when he died.

Reaction
The Nevada State Journal proclaimed, "Nevada's novel death law is upheld by the highest court—humanity." However, the San Jose Mercury News printed, "One hundred years from now Nevada will be referred to as a heathen commonwealth controlled by savages with only the outward symbols of civilization."

Warden Dickerson reported to Nevada governor James G. Scrugham and the legislature his opinion that the use of lethal gas was impractical and that he thought execution by firing squad was still the best method of execution.

See also

 Andriza Mircovich
 Capital punishment in Nevada
 List of people executed in Nevada
 Capital punishment in the United States
 Chinese Exclusion Act

References

Further reading

External links
 1924: Gee Jon, debuting the gas chamber at ExecutedToday.com
 State of Nevada v. Gee Jon, 211 pp. 676–1923
 Gee Jon's chair at themobmuseum.org

1890s births
1924 deaths
20th-century executions by Nevada
Chinese emigrants to the United States
Chinese people executed abroad
Executed people from Guangdong
People convicted of murder by Nevada
People executed by Nevada by gas chamber
People executed for murder
People from San Francisco
Year of birth uncertain